Commissaire Moulin (English: Police Commissioner Moulin) is a French television series created by Paul Andréota and Claude Boissol and starring Yves Rénier as the title character, Commissaire Jean-Paul Moulin. The show started in 1976, was canceled in 1982, resumed in 1989 and finally ended in 2008. The entire series spans seventy 90 minute episodes.

Plot
The series follows the adventures of lighthearted Jean-Paul Moulin, a police Commissaire, and his team as they solve crimes.

Actors
Yves Rénier : Commissaire Jean-Paul Moulin
Clément Michu : Inspector Galland
Guy Montagné : Guyomard
Jean-Pierre Kérien : Rocard
Jean-Luc Moreau : Alex
Diane Simenon : Poupette
Laurence Charpentier : Lolo
Natacha Amal : Samantha Beaumont
Annie Balestra : Baba
Tchee : Le Chinois
Francis Lax : Director
Régis Anders : Deputy Director
Samantha Rénier : Marie Moulin
Bernard Rosselli : Commander Léon Guermer
Alice Béat : Lieutenant Charlotte Marszewski
Anne-Charlotte Pontabry : Doctor Sophie Moulin
Daniel Russo : Shalom

Other actors appearing in the series

 Jean-Claude Dauphin (Bernard Deffoux, Ricochets, 1976)
 Sophie Barjac (Joëlle, Ricochets, 1976)
 Pierre Vernier (Jacques Frémont, La peur des autres, 1976)
 Paul Crauchet (Cassius, Choc en retour, 1976)
 Marie-Christine Adam  (Orlane, Choc en retour, 1976)
 Tsilla Chelton (Tante Moulin, Petite hantise, 1977)
 Bernard Alane (Judge, Marée basse, 1977) 
 Henri-Jacques Huet (Coral, Marée basse, 1977)
 Michel Auclair (Commissaire Kirs, Affectation spéciale, 1977)
 Véronique Jannot (Corinne, Intox, 1978)
 Jean Benguigui  (Max, Intox, 1979)
 Olga Georges-Picot (Cécile, Fausse note, 1978)
 Michèle Baumgartner (Rom, Les brebis egarées, 1979)
 Jean-Pierre Castaldi  (José, Les brebis egarées, 1979)
 Lorraine Bracco (Jenny, Le transfuge, 1980)
 Claude Jade (Isabelle Mencier, L'amie d’enfance, 1981)
 Philippe Nahon  (Pillette, L’amie d’enfance, 1981)
 Dorothée Jemma (Gigite, L’amie d’enfance, 1981, Françoise Brunetti, „Le récidiviste“, 1994)
 Vincent Grass (Inspector Gervoise, L’amie d’enfance, 1981)
 Hans Meyer (Assassin, L’amie d’enfance, 1981)
 Raymond Pellegrin (Neubauer, La bavure, 1981)
 Paul Le Person (Pierre Chartier, Le Patron, 1982)
 Philippe Laudenbach  (Valeri, Le Patron, 1982)
 Béatrice Agenin  (Camille Chartier, Le Patron, 1982)
 Élisabeth Wiener (Anne Loven, Une promenade en fôret, 1982)
 Dominique Paturel (Toscane, Une promenade en fôret, 1982)
 Nelly Benedetti (Sylvie Callot, Une promenade en fôret, 1982)
 Gilles Segal  (Jean Caradec, Un hanneton sur le dos, 1982)
 Robert Etcheverry (Manuel Coeixera, Courvée de bois, 1989)
 Bruno Pradal (Bertrand, Match nul, 1990)
 Charles Gérard (Mario, Bras d’honneur, 1990)
 Dani (la mère de Momo, Non-assistance à personne en danger, 1992)
 Jean-Pierre Bisson (le beau-père de Momo, Non-assistance à personne en danger, 1992)
 François Levantal (Franck, Les zombies, 1992)
 Jean-Pierre Malo (Mirko, Le Simulateur, 1992)
 Jacques Dacqmine (Cattoire, L... comme Lennon, 1992)
 Franck de la Personne (Gilles Lecourbe, Syndrome de menace, 1993)
 Philippe Leroy (Fabian, Syndrome de ménace, 1993)
 Viktor Lazlo (Marie, Mort d'un officier de police, 1994)
 Olivier Marchal  (le chat, Mort d’un officier de police, 1994, Vava, „Serial Killer“, 1999)
 Jean-Pierre Kalfon (Le récidiviste, 1994)
 Tristan Calvez  (Laurent Leguen, Illégitime défense, 1995)
 Nicolas Marié  (Maitre Boileau, Illégitime défense, 1995)
 Michel Creton (Louis, Silence radio, 1998)
 Nadège Beausson-Diagne (Serial killer, 1999)
 Mike Marshall (Machard, Une protection très rapprochée, 2000)
 Jean-Marie Winling  (Simon-Grangier, „Mortelle séduction“, 2000, Un coupable trop parfait, 2005)
 François Dunoyer (Staub, Au nom des enfants, 2001)
 Roger Dumas (Ferrandini, Un flic sous influence, 2001)
 Étienne Chicot (Guy Giuliani Série noire, 2003)
 Mhamed Arezki  (Mouss, Sale bizness, 2003)
 Anthony Delon (Hugo Arragio, Bandit d’honneur, 2004)
 Christopher Buchholz (Gérard Brovinsky, Un coupable trop parfait, 2005)
 Patrick Fierry (Maurice Guibert, Le sniper, 2005)
 Cécile Pallas (Catherine Garnier, Le sniper, 2005)
 Jean-Yves Berteloot (Pierre Sébastien, Sous pression, 2005)
 Johnny Hallyday (William Torrano, Kidnapping, 2005)
 Xavier Deluc  (Veraghen, „Kidnapping“, 2005)
 Jean-François Stévenin (Jacques Mirvin, „Kidnapping“, 2005)
 Babsie Steger (Fidèle, La pente raide, 2005)
 Christian Vadim (Paul Guersant, Le profil de tueur, 2006)
 Paul Barge (Me Boistard, La promesse, 2006)
 Mathieu Carrière (Michel Léobard, La dernière affaire, 2006)
Fanny Sidney (Véronique Léonard, La dernière affaire, 2006)
Olivier Saladin (Peruz, La fille du chef, 2007)

Directors
Guy Lefranc & Gérard Marx direct 1 Episode.

See also
 List of French television series

References

External links
 Commissaire Moulin on French Wikipedia
 Commissaire Moulin on AlloCiné
 

French police procedural television series
1976 French television series debuts
Television shows set in France
2008 French television series endings
1970s French television series
1980s French television series
1990s French television series
2000s French television series